Daucourt is a French surname. Notable people with the surname include:

Chantal Daucourt (born 1966), Swiss cross-country mountain biker and ski mountaineer
Gerard Daucourt (born 1941), Swiss bishop

See also
Élise-Daucourt, commune in the Marne department in north-eastern France

French-language surnames